The 1956 Penn Quakers football team was an American football team that represented the University of Pennsylvania as a member of the Ivy League during the 1956 NCAA University Division football season. 

In their third year under head coach Steve Sebo, the Quakers compiled a 5–4 record but were outscored 216 to 96. Charles Gill and Peter Keblish were the team captains.

Penn's 4–3 conference record tied for third place in the Ivy League. This was the first season of formal play for the league, and marked the renewal for the Quakers of several rivalries that hadn't been played in recent years. Only four of Penn's 1955 opponents (Cornell, Navy, Penn State, Princeton) carried over to the new season. The rest of the Ivy League teams had not played Penn since 1952 or earlier; Harvard and Yale hadn't been on the schedule since World War II.

Penn played its home games at Franklin Field adjacent to the university's campus in Philadelphia, Pennsylvania.

Schedule

References

Penn
Penn Quakers football seasons
Penn Quakers football